Harry Smith (1951 – 19 June 2020) was a Westminster Correspondent for STV News and occasional Correspondent and freelancer for Channel 4 News, ITV News and Aljazeera.

Career
Harry Smith started his career in 1969 as Editor of local newspaper "Forfar Dispatch", before moving to Bristol to become a reporter for "Western Daily".  Harry returned to Scotland in 1979 to work with Radio Forth. Smith joined the BBC in 1980, as a reporter before moving to Scottish Television in 1987. A year later he joined ITN news; becoming 'Home Affairs Correspondent' in March 1994, 'Scotland Political Correspondent' in 1997.

Harry left ITN in 2007, but joined STV news shortly afterwards as the Westminster Correspondent.

He died on 19 June 2020, aged 69.

References

External links

1951 births
2020 deaths
ITN newsreaders and journalists
STV News newsreaders and journalists